NJS may refer to

National Jet Systems, an Australian airline
Nihon Jitensha Shinkōkai (Japan Keirin Association), now replaced by the JKA Foundation
Nairobi Japanese School
 'NaJin Black Sword' a South Korean professional League Of Legends team, sponsored by NaJin Corporation
Naval Justice School
New Jersey Southern Railroad
Nurmijärven Jalkapalloseura, Finnish football club
New jack swing